Abdul Basit (born 29 April 2003) is an Afghan cricketer. He made his first-class debut for Amo Region in the 2019 Ahmad Shah Abdali 4-day Tournament on 29 April 2019. He made his List A debut for Amo Region in the 2019 Ghazi Amanullah Khan Regional One Day Tournament on 19 September 2019.

References

External links
 

2003 births
Living people
Afghan cricketers
Amo Sharks cricketers
Place of birth missing (living people)